Mac Giolla is a prefix-phrase used in some Irish surnames, meaning "son of the devotee of" (which is usually followed by the name of a prominent Christian saint).  Examples of some notable individuals who bear this phrase in their surnames are:

 Tomás Mac Giolla (1924–2010), former Irish member of parliament 
 Antoine Mac Giolla Bhrighde (1957–1984), Provisional Irish Republican Army (IRA) volunteer
 Brian Mac Giolla Phádraig (c. 1580–c. 1652), Irish scholar and poet
 Cathal Buí Mac Giolla Ghunna (c. 1680–1756), Irish poet